Darmera peltata, the Indian rhubarb or umbrella plant, is a flowering plant, the only species within the genus Darmera in the family Saxifragaceae. The name Darmera honours Karl Darmer, a 19th-century German horticulturist.

In late spring the flowers emerge before the leaves, with rounded cymes of numerous five-petalled white to bright pink flowers (measuring up to 1.5 cm across each) borne on flower stems up to 2m long.  The leaves are peltate, rounded, deeply lobed, coarsely toothed, conspicuously veined and dark green, also on stems up to 2m in height.  The leaves turn red in autumn.

In gardens, Darmera peltata flourishes in pond margins and bog gardens, where it forms an imposing umbrella-like clump.  It is suited to smaller gardens where there is no room for Gunnera manicata or Gunnera tinctoria, distantly related plants that are somewhat similar in appearance, but much larger.

Darmera peltata has gained the Royal Horticultural Society's Award of Garden Merit.

References

Brickell, Christopher, 1996, The Royal Horticultural Society A-Z Encyclopedia of Garden Plants  London: RHS/Dorling Kindersley

External links

Jepson Manual Treatment
Photo gallery

Saxifragaceae
Saxifragaceae genera
Monotypic Saxifragales genera
Flora of California
Flora of Oregon
Flora without expected TNC conservation status